Barry Harris Plays Barry Harris is an album by pianist Barry Harris performing his own compositions which was recorded in 1978 and released on the Xanadu label.

Reception

Allmusic awarded the album 4 stars with its review by Scott Yanow stating, "For this excellent Xanadu set (an LP that was reissued briefly on CD), pianist Barry Harris (not particularly famous as a composer) performs seven of his catchy originals, most of which are based on the chord changes of bop standards".

Track listing 
All compositions by Barry Harris
 Chances Go Around" - 4:41 
 "Bachyard" - 7:29 
 "Luminescence" - 3:35 
 "Even Tempered" - 5:24 
 "Inca" - 5:22 
 "Father Flanagan" - 9:03 
 "Apache" - 5:13

Personnel 
 Barry Harris - piano
 George Duvivier - bass
 Leroy Williams - drums

References 

Barry Harris albums
1978 albums
Xanadu Records albums
Albums produced by Don Schlitten